Michael Rye (born John Michael Riorden Billsbury; March 2, 1918 – September 20, 2012) was an American actor. His decades-long career spanned radio, television, animated cartoons and video games. Aside from his voice over work, Rye also acted in on-screen television roles as well, including parts in Dr. Kildare and 77 Sunset Strip.

He is also credited in TL Osborn's gospel documentaries as the narrator.

Early life
Rye was born John Michael Riorden Billsbury in Chicago, Illinois.

Radio career
He began his career during the Golden Age of Radio when radio programming was at the height of its popularity. Rye, who broadcast from Chicago, participated in an average of forty network radio shows per week.

He was cast in numerous lead roles for radio shows, including Gary Curtis for the NBC soap opera, Ma Perkins; Tim Lawrence on Guiding Light; Jack Armstrong on the radio adventure series, Jack Armstrong, the All-American Boy; and Pembroke in the soap opera, Backstage Wife.

He starred in radio productions produced and broadcast from Hollywood, including the ABC crime drama, This is Your FBI; the radio anthology series, Lux Radio Theater; the radio drama, The Whistler; the CBS radio comedy, Meet Millie; and the CBS drama, Suspense. He also provided the narration for the world's first full-length recorded book, the 1969 audio adaptation of The Autobiography of Benjamin Franklin.

Animation
With the advent of television, Rye transitioned from radio to animated shows and on-screen acting roles. In addition to lending his sonorous bass-baritone voice as the Lone Ranger in the 1966–1969 animated cartoon series based on the character, for which he is perhaps best remembered, Rye worked extensively in Hanna-Barbera productions, including the Scooby-Doo series during the 1970s, and later provided voices for Pound Puppies, which aired on ABC's Saturday morning lineup from 1986 to 1989. During this time, he also played Mr. Slaghoople, Wilma's Dad in The Flintstone Kids.

He voiced both Apache Chief and Green Lantern in Hanna-Barbera's Challenge of the Super Friends, The All-New Super Friends Hour, and Super Friends.

He was also cast in Disney's Adventures of the Gummi Bears, which aired from 1985 to 1991, as the voices of King Gregor and his nemesis Duke Igthorn, who is the nemesis of the Gummi Bears as well.

Television
Rye's on-screen television roles included parts on Schlitz Playhouse of Stars, M Squad, 77 Sunset Strip, General Electric Theater, Dr. Kildare, and Wagon Train.

Later career
Rye appeared in television and radio commercials until his retirement from advertising in the late 1990s. His career, which began in radio, also spanned the video game era in the 1980s, 1990s, and 2000s.  Rye narrated thousands of training films, videos and software for industrial and workplace functions.

Rye served as the National President of the Information Film Producers of America (IFPA) in the 1970s for a single two-year term. He was also inducted as an honorary, lifetime member of Sperdvac, the Society to Preserve and Encourage Radio Drama, Variety and Comedy.

Michael Rye died from a short illness on September 20, 2012, in Los Angeles at the age of 94. He was survived by his wife, Patricia Foster Rye.

Filmography

Live action
 Hands of a Stranger - George Britton
 Two Lost Worlds - Captain Hackett
 The Adventures of Rin Tin Tin - Ace Rocklin (ep. "Pritikin's Predicament")
 Jane Wyman Presents - Fred Jackson (ep. "The Bravado Touch")
 Wagon Train - Hanlon (ep. "The Liam Fitzmorgan Story")
 M Squad - Carlson (ep. "The Crush Out")
 Perry Mason - Commentator (ep. "The Story of the Laughing Lady")
 Mr. Terrific - The President (ep. "I Can't Fly")
 Mission: Impossible - Agent Belson (ep. "The Traitor")

Animated roles
 A Pup Named Scooby-Doo - Skippy Johnson, Arnie Barney
 The All-New Super Friends Hour - Apache Chief, Green Lantern
 Battle of the Planets - President Kane, Additional Voices
 Challenge of the Super Friends - Apache Chief, Green Lantern
 Disney's Adventures of the Gummi Bears - Duke Igthorn, King Gregor, Sir Gawain
 DuckTales - Narrator (for the recap sequences in the serialized versions of Time is Money and Super Ducktales)
 Hot Wheels - Jack "Rabbit" Wheeler
 Skyhawks - Captain Mike Wilson
 Mighty Man and Yukk - Main Title Narrator
 Pink Panther and Sons - Additional Voices
 Scooby and Scrappy-Doo - Additional Voices
 Shirt Tales - Additional Voices
 Snorks - Additional Voices
 Spider-Man - Mysterio
 Spider-Man - Farley Stillwell
 Spider-Man and His Amazing Friends - Magneto
 Super Friends - Apache Chief, Green Lantern
 Super Friends: The Legendary Super Powers Show - Apache Chief, Green Lantern
 The 13 Ghosts of Scooby-Doo - Demondo, Zimbulu, Reflector Specter
 The Adventures of Don Coyote and Sancho Panda - Additional Voices
 The All-New Scooby and Scrappy-Doo Show - Additional Voices
 The Dukes - Additional Voices
 The Flintstone Kids - Mr. Slaghoople
 The Greatest Adventure: Stories from the Bible - Narrator
 The Godzilla Power Hour - Additional Voices
 The Incredible Hulk - The Supreme Hydra/Steve Perry, Jasper Bryn
 The Lone Ranger - Lone Ranger
 The Mork & Mindy / Laverne & Shirley / Fonz Hour - Additional Voices
 The Plastic Man Comedy/Adventure Show - Main Title Narrator
 The Real Ghostbusters - Dr. Crowley
 The Scooby & Scrappy-Doo/Puppy Hour - Additional Voices
 The Smurfs - Additional Voices
 The Super Globetrotters - Narrator
 The Super Powers Team: Galactic Guardians - Green Lantern
 Yogi's Treasure Hunt - Additional Voices
 Fluppy Dogs - J. J. Wagstaff

Films
 Hugo the Hippo - Grownups
 Scooby-Doo Meets the Boo Brothers - Mayor
 Yogi and the Invasion of the Space Bears - Ranger Jones

Video games
 Dragon's Lair - Narrator
 Space Ace - Narrator
 Dragon's Lair II: Time Warp - Narrator

Information Film Narrator
 Various Productions for Aerojet-General Corporation Sacramento
 Various Productions for Air Force Space & Missile Systems Center

Radio
 Announcer on The Cisco Kid (1943–1945)
 Jack Armstrong on Jack Armstrong, the All-American Boy (1944–1946)
 The Narrator on Mystery House (1944–1946)
 Announcer on Joyce Jordan, M.D. (1944–1947)
 Mr. First Nighter on The First Nighter Program (1945–1954)
 Gary Curtis on Ma Perkins (1945–1959)
 Reverend Dr. John Ruthledge on Guiding Light (1947–49, replacing Arthur Peterson, Jr.)
 Mark Dillon in the first Gunsmoke audition show (1949)
 Several roles on Backstage Wife (1940s)
 Hank Stafford on Granby's Green Acres (1950)
 Johnny Booth Jr. on Meet Millie (1951–1954)
 Several roles on Dangerous Assignment (1953)
 Several roles on Lux Radio Theater (1950s)
 Announcer on The Horizons West Show'' (1965–1966)

References

External links
 
 
 1979 Interview with Michael Rye on Speaking of Radio.com
 Obituary - Variety

1918 births
2012 deaths
American male radio actors
American male television actors
American male video game actors
American male voice actors
Male actors from Chicago